Pontus Karl Fredrik Gustafsson (born 15 August 1955, in Stockholm) is a Swedish actor. He started his career when he was 12 years old, then he played Mowgli's Swedish voice in The Jungle Book ("Djungelboken" in Swedish). Since 1977 he works at the Royal Dramatic Theatre. 2002–2004 he played the teddy bear Björne in the popular children's TV program Björnes magasin.

Selected filmography
1968 - Farbror Blås nya båt
1977 - Paradise Place
1984 - Sömnen
1988 - Xerxes (TV series)
1990 - Kära farmor (TV)
1991 - Goltuppen
1992 - Jönssonligan och den svarta diamanten
1993 - Murder at the Savoy
1993 - Drömkåken
1994 - Jönssonligans största kupp
1994 - Läckan (TV)
1995 - Snoken (TV)
1996 - The White Lioness
1997 - Persons parfymeri (TV)
1997 - Emma åklagare (TV)
1997 - Skärgårdsdoktorn (TV)
2001 - Eva & Adam – fyra födelsedagar och ett fiasko
2002 - Beck – Kartellen

References

External links
Pontus Gustafsson on the website of the Royal Dramatic Theatre

1955 births
Living people
Male actors from Stockholm
Swedish male film actors
Swedish male television actors
Swedish male voice actors
Swedish male stage actors
Swedish male child actors
Litteris et Artibus recipients
20th-century Swedish male actors
21st-century Swedish male actors